The Thai FA Cup 2010 is the 17th season of Thailand knockout football competition. The tournament is organized by the Football Association of Thailand.

The cup winner were guaranteed a place in the 2011 AFC Cup.

Calendar

Qualifying round

|colspan="3" style="background-color:#99CCCC"|17 March 2010

|-
|colspan="3" style="background-color:#99CCCC"|24 March 2010

|}

First round

|colspan="3" style="background-color:#99CCCC"|17 March 2010

|-
|colspan="3" style="background-color:#99CCCC"|24 March 2010

|-
|colspan="3" style="background-color:#99CCCC"|31 March 2010

|-
|colspan="3" style="background-color:#99CCCC"|7 April 2010

|-
|colspan="3" style="background-color:#99CCCC"|21 April 2010

|}

Second round

|colspan="3" style="background-color:#99CCCC"|12 May 2010

|-
|colspan="3" style="background-color:#99CCCC"|19 May 2010

|-
|colspan="3" style="background-color:#99CCCC"|26 May 2010

|-
|colspan="3" style="background-color:#99CCCC"|30 May 2010

|-
|colspan="3" style="background-color:#99CCCC"|2 June 2010

|-
|colspan="3" style="background-color:#99CCCC"|9 June 2010

|}

Third round

|colspan="3" style="background-color:#99CCCC"|16 June 2010

|-
|colspan="3" style="background-color:#99CCCC"|23 June 2010

|-
|colspan="3" style="background-color:#99CCCC"|30 June 2010

|-
|colspan="3" style="background-color:#99CCCC"|7 July 2010

|-
|colspan="3" style="background-color:#99CCCC"|11 July 2010

|-
|colspan="3" style="background-color:#99CCCC"|14 July 2010

|-
|colspan="3" style="background-color:#99CCCC"|31 July 2010

|-
|colspan="3" style="background-color:#99CCCC"|1 August 2010

|}

Fourth round

|colspan="3" style="background-color:#99CCCC"|11 August 2010

|-
|colspan="3" style="background-color:#99CCCC"|25 August 2010

|-
|colspan="3" style="background-color:#99CCCC"|26 August 2010

|-
|colspan="3" style="background-color:#99CCCC"|5 September 2010

|-
|colspan="3" style="background-color:#99CCCC"|7 September 2010

|}

Quarter-finals

|colspan="3" style="background-color:#99CCCC"|15 September 2010

|-
|colspan="3" style="background-color:#99CCCC"|26 October 2010

|}

Semi-finals

|colspan="3" style="background-color:#99CCCC"|30 October 2010

|-
|}

Finals

|colspan="3" style="background-color:#99CCCC"|28 November 2010

|-
|}

Thai FA Cup seasons
1